Alfabet/Alphabet: A Memoir of a First Language is a book written by Canadian poet Sadiqa de Meijer. It is a collection of essays and a record of her transitioning from speaking Dutch to English. The book was published in October 2020 by Palimpsest Press of Windsor, Ontario, and won the 2021 Governor General's Literary Award for English-language non-fiction.

Synopsis 
de Meijer's alfabet/alphabet chronicles her transition from speaking Dutch, her mother tongue, to English, her adopted tongue.  By taking an eclectic approach to narrative, she examines the shifting cultural currents of language by exploring topics of identity, geography, family, and translation.  As a result, alfabet/alphabet identifies components of fellow linguistic migrants' experiences, while leaving lifelong English speakers with a different perspective of their mother tongue.

Awards 
alfabet/alphabet: a memoir of a first language, won the Governor General’s Literary Award for English-language non-fiction at the 2021 Governor General's Awards.

Reception 
alfabet/alphabet was generally well received.  Cara Nelissen at the Literary Review of Canada comments, "de Meijer weaves little gems throughout alfabet/­alphabet, including a four-page list of what English-speakers think Dutch sounds like".  At Goodreads, Susan Gillis finds it, "An important book that expands the genre of memoir and deserves to be widely read and shared." and adds, "Brilliant, insightful writing that's warm and generous".  Joanne Booy-De Moor at The Banner writes, "This slim volume is academically rigorous and poetically playful as she explores questions of identity, landscape, and family".

References 

2021 non-fiction books
Canadian memoirs
Governor General's Award-winning non-fiction books
Canadian essay collections